Stock Yards Village (commonly misspelled as Stockyards Village) is a shopping centre in Toronto, Ontario, Canada. It is Located at Weston Road and St. Clair Avenue West in The Junction neighbourhood. The mall was opened in March 2014 and is anchored by several major stores, including SportChek, Winners, and HomeSense. The mall formerly had a Target from March 2014 to April 2015, and the space was vacant from April 2015 to November 2017, when Nations Fresh Foods opened.

Located in close proximity to Gunns Loop, it is easily accessible by TTC streetcar 512 St. Clair.

History

The site of the mall was once part of the larger Stock Yards area and Swift and Company meat processing plant in Toronto.

Anchors & majors retailers

 Nations Fresh Foods, opened on 
 SportChek, opened summer 2014
 Winners, opened summer 2014
 PetSmart, opened summer 2014
 HomeSense, opened summer 2014
 Linen Chest, opened summer 2014
 Michaels, opened summer 2014
 Bouclair Home, opened summer 2014
 Pier 1 Imports, opened summer 2014
 Anytime Fitness, opened late 2016/early 2017

External links

References

Shopping malls in Toronto
2014 establishments in Ontario